The Sirionó are an indigenous people of Bolivia. They primarily live in the forested northern and eastern parts of Beni and northwestern Santa Cruz departments of Bolivia. They live between the San Martín, Negro Rivers, and the Machado River.

Name
"Sirionó" comes from a neighboring language, in which síri means "tucum palm". Their autonym is Miá, meaning "the people." They are also known as the Chori, Ñiose, Qurungua, Tirinié, or Yande people. The Sirionós are tall and strong, although thin, due to the continuous movement and hardships of wildlife.

"Their strength is extraordinary because Herzog tells us that they shoot arrows up to 80 meters with their bows, while the Guarayos could not shoot the same weapons more than 30 meters away."

Their complexion is dark, although somewhat lighter than that of the Guarayos, probably because of their life in the shade of the trees. Some are said to have almost white skin, brown hair and light eyes. Its aspect is rather Arauco than Guarani.

Language
The Sirionó language is a Guarayú language of the Tupí-Guaraní language family, written in the Latin script. The language is taught in primary schools. A whistled language has been observed among Sirionós.

History
Sirionó people originated in the Gran Chaco and moved north in the Amazon rainforest. First contact with Spaniards was in the 1690s. Later Jesuits tried to missionize them and convince them to lead sedentary lives. Sirionó people died from diseases introduced by Europeans, and by the dawn of the 20th century, only 500 survived. They lived either in remote forests or worked as ranch or farm hands.

Culture
Sirionó traditionally were semi-nomadic and fished, hunted, gathered wild plants, and farmed. They cultivated maize, sweet potatoes, and sweet cassava. They brewed beer from maize.

Traditional Sirionó houses were often only temporary structures with wooden supports and palm leaf roofs that could house up to 120 people at a time. Families were matrilineal and matrilocal, that is, young married couples would live in the wife's community.

Notes

References
 Olson, James Stuart. The Indians of Central and South America: An Ethnohistorical Dictionary. Greenwood Publishing Group, 1991. .

Indigenous peoples in Bolivia
Indigenous peoples of the Amazon
Beni Department
Santa Cruz Department (Bolivia)